The Vinyl Conflict is a box set by the thrash metal band Slayer, released October 12, 2010. It includes all ten of Slayer's studio albums since 1986 and their 1991 live album Decade of Aggression. The idea of releasing a second box set was made public in August 2010. It was first released with a price of $199.99. The albums are all in vinyl and are remastered. It received generally positive reception from critics.

Conception
In August 2010, it was announced that band would be releasing a second box set after Soundtrack to the Apocalypse (2003), and would include every one of Slayer's studio albums from 1986's Reign In Blood to 2009's World Painted Blood. It originally had a price tag of $199.99, but is now sold at retail price of $149.98. It was released through American Recordings and Sony. Blabbermouth.net noted that they are "treating the albums the way they would treat a great jazz, classical, Bob Dylan or Miles Davis record, something that isn't normally done for metal records." To increase quality, lacquers were cut several times, and the original albums were remastered. It was released as a high-quality 180 gram audiophile vinyl, pressed at RTI, an American pressing plant. The vinyl discs are packaged in a standard, clear inner sleeve to preserve the vinyl, and are also in high-quality litho-wrapped jackets, and boxed in a slipcase. Reproductions of the original albums inner sleeve artwork were converted to 12 inch square inserts to fit the standard vinyl disc covers.

Adam Farber of Sony Music Entertainment explained: "The vinyl box is a real treat for fans, especially with today's renewed and increased interest in vinyl." It is the first time that ten of Slayer's studio albums have been mass-produced on vinyl. Dino Paredes of American Recordings relates: "It's been years and years since the Slayer vinyl has been in print — only the two most recent albums are currently available on vinyl, the rest have been out of print for years and very hard to find. These albums sound spectacular — they sound like you've never heard them before. Everything about 'The Vinyl Conflict' — the look of it, the feel of it — is very strong, very powerful, very Slayer, from the music to the dripping, bloody pentagram on the front of the box. It's perfect."

Reception
John Kosik of the Associated Press criticized its price, stating: "For $200, casual fans may want to steer clear." Kosik also said that what it "offers the hard-core listener goes beyond the distinct romance of vinyl's warm, earthy sound." Bob Gendron of TONEAudio wrote that the box set was a "godsend" and also said that they were "amazingly produced LPs that bring to life several of the greatest metal records ever made…" Guitar World praised the box set for its mastering, saying the benefits of the treatment "are immediately clear when you drop the needle onto one of these babies. Basically all the songs Slayer fans lose their mind over are here, sounding heavier, livelier and more brutal than ever." He also said that the remastering made a listener want to thoroughly listen to the music.

Album listing

References

2010 compilation albums
Slayer compilation albums
American Recordings (record label) compilation albums